The Poor Clares, officially the Order of Saint Clare, originally referred to as the Order of Poor Ladies, and also known as the Clarisses or Clarissines, the Minoresses, the Franciscan Clarist Order, and the Second Order of Saint Francis, are members of a contemplative Order of nuns in the Catholic Church. The Poor Clares were the second Franciscan branch of the order to be established. Founded by Clare of Assisi and Francis of Assisi on Palm Sunday in the year 1212, they were organized after the Order of Friars Minor (the first Order), and before the Third Order of Saint Francis for the laity. As of 2011, there were over 20,000 Poor Clare nuns in over 75 countries throughout the world. They follow several different observances and are organized into federations.

The Poor Clares follow the Rule of St. Clare, which was approved by Pope Innocent IV on the day before Clare's death in 1253. The main branch of the Order (O.S.C.) follows the observance of Pope Urban. Other branches established since that time, who operate under their own unique Constitutions, are the Colettine Poor Clares (P.C.C.) (founded 1410), the Capuchin Poor Clares (O.S.C. Cap) (founded 1538) and the Poor Clares of Perpetual Adoration (P.C.P.A.) (founded 1854).

Foundation and rule

The Poor Clares were founded by Clare of Assisi in 1212. Little is known of Clare's early life, although popular tradition hints that she came from a fairly well-to-do family in Assisi. At the age of 17, inspired by the preaching of Francis in the cathedral, Clare ran away from home to join her community of friars at the Portiuncula, some distance outside the town. Although, according to tradition, her family wanted to take her back by force, Clare's dedication to holiness and poverty inspired the friars to accept her resolution. She was given the habit of a nun and transferred to Benedictine monasteries, first at Bastia and then at Sant' Angelo di Panzo, for her monastic formation.

By 1216, Francis was able to offer Clare and her companions a monastery adjoining the chapel of San Damiano where she became abbess. Clare's mother, two of her sisters and some other wealthy women from Florence soon joined her new order. Clare dedicated her order to the strict principles of Francis, setting a rule of extreme poverty far more severe than that of any female order of the time. Clare's determination that her order not be wealthy or own property, and that the nuns live entirely from alms given by local people, was initially protected by the papal bull Privilegium paupertatis, issued by Pope Innocent III. By this time the order had grown to number three monasteries.

Spread of the order
The movement quickly spread, though in a somewhat disorganized fashion, with several monasteries of women devoted to the Franciscan ideal springing up elsewhere in Northern Italy. At this point Ugolino, Cardinal Bishop of Ostia (the future Pope Gregory IX), was given the task of overseeing all such monasteries and preparing a formal rule. Although monasteries at Monticello, Perugia, Siena, Gattajola and elsewhere adopted the new rule – which allowed for property to be held in trust by the papacy for the various communities – it was not adopted by Clare herself or her monastery at San Damiano. Ugolino's Rule, originally based on the Benedictine one, was amended in 1263 by Pope Urban IV to allow for the communal ownership of property, and was adopted by a growing number of monasteries across Europe. Communities adopting this less rigorous rule came to be known as the Order of Saint Clare (O.S.C.) or the Urbanist Poor Clares.

Clare herself resisted the Ugolino Rule, since it did not closely enough follow the ideal of complete poverty advocated by Francis. On 9 August 1253, she managed to obtain a papal bull, Solet annuere, establishing a rule of her own, more closely following that of the friars, which forbade the possession of property either individually or as a community. Originally applying only to Clare's community at San Damiano, this rule was also adopted by many monasteries. Communities that followed this stricter rule were fewer in number than the followers of the rule formulated by Cardinal Ugolino, and became known simply as "Poor Clares" (P.C.) or Primitives. Many sources before 1263 refer to them as Damianites (after San Damiano).

The situation was further complicated a century later when Colette of Corbie restored the primitive rule of strict poverty to 17 French monasteries. Her followers came to be called the Colettine Poor Clares (P.C.C.). Two further branches, the Capuchin Poor Clares (O.S.C. Cap.) and the Alcantarines, also followed the strict observance. The later group disappeared as a distinct group when their observance among the friars was ended, with the friars being merged by the Holy See into the wider observant branch of the First Order.

The spread of the order began in 1218 when a monastery was founded in Perugia; new foundations quickly followed in Florence, Venice, Mantua, and Padua. Agnes of Assisi, a sister of Clare, introduced the order to Spain, where Barcelona and Burgos hosted major communities. The order then expanded to Belgium and France, where a monastery was founded at Reims in 1229, followed by Montpellier, Cahors, Bordeaux, Metz, and Besançon. A monastery at Marseilles was founded directly from Assisi in 1254. The Poor Clares monastery founded by Queen Margaret in Paris, St. Marcel, was where she died in 1295. King Philip IV and Queen Joan founded a monastery at Moncel in the Beauvais diocese. By A.D. 1300 there were 47 Poor Clare monasteries in Spain alone.

Europe

United Kingdom
The first Poor Clare monastery in England was founded in 1286 in Newcastle upon Tyne. In medieval England, where the nuns were known as "minoresses", their principal monastery was located near Aldgate, known as the Abbey of the Order of St Clare. The order gave its name to the still-extant street known as Minories on the eastern boundary of the City of London.

After the dissolution of the monasteries under King Henry VIII, several religious communities formed in continental Europe for English Catholics. One such was a Poor Clare monastery founded in 1609 at Gravelines by Mary Ward. Later expelled from their monastery by the French Revolutionary Army in 1795, the community eventually relocated to England. They settled first in Northumberland, and then in 1857 built a monastery in Darlington, which was in existence until 2007.

Following Catholic emancipation in the first half of the 19th century, other Poor Clares came to the United Kingdom, eventually establishing communities in, e.g., Notting Hill (1857, which was forced to relocate by the local council in the 1960s, and settled in the village of Arkley in 1969), Woodchester (1860–2011), Levenshulme (1863), Much Birch (1880), Arundel (1886), Lynton (founded from Rennes, France, 1904–2010s), Woodford Green (1920–1969), York (1865–2015) and Nottingham (1927).

The community in Luton was founded in 1976 to meet a shortage of teachers for local Catholic schools. It was originally based at 18 London Road in a large Edwardian house. In 1996, the community refocused on a ministry of social work and prayer, and moved to a smaller, modern home at Abigail Close, Wardown Park.

Communities of Colettine Poor Clares were founded in England at Baddesley Clinton (1850–2011), Ellesmere, Shropshire. They have communities in Belfast, Northern Ireland, and in Bothwell, Scotland (1952). In Wales, there was a monastery in Hawarden. The one that used to be based in Neath moved to Bothwell.

Ireland
In Ireland there are seven monasteries of the Colettine Observance. The community with the oldest historical roots is the monastery on Nuns' Island in Galway, which traces its history back to the monastery in Gravelines. The community has a rare book collection which is the most comprehensive single collection of early-modern Clarissan material in English in the world.   

Originally a separate community of Irish women under a common mother superior with the English nuns, they moved to Dublin in 1629, the first monastic community in Ireland for a century. The first Abbess was Cecily Dillon, a daughter of Theobald Dillon, 1st Viscount Dillon. War forced the community to move back to Galway in 1642. From that point on, persecution under the Penal Laws and war led to repeated destruction of their monastery and scattering of the community over two centuries, until 1825, when fifteen nuns were able to re-establish monastic life permanently on the site.

Later monasteries were founded in 1906 in both Carlow and Dublin. From these, foundations were established in Cork (1914) and Ennis (1958). In 1973, an enclosed community of nuns of the Franciscan Third Order Regular in Drumshanbo, founded in England in 1852 and established there in 1864, transferred to the Second Order, under this Observance.

There is Poor Clares monastery in Faughart, Co. Louth.

Continental Europe

Currently there are communities of Colettine Poor Clares in Bruges, Belgium, as well as in Eindhoven, the Netherlands, and in Larvik, Norway. There are several monasteries in Hungary, Lithuania and Poland of the Urbanist and Capuchin Observances.

There are notable Clarissine churches in Bamberg, Bratislava, Brixen, and Nuremberg. There also is a small community in Münster, Germany, and a Capuchin monastery in Sigolsheim, France.

The last six Poor Clare nuns from a convent in Belgium were able to sell their convent and move to the South of France in luxury cars.

Scandinavia

Americas

United States
After an abortive attempt to establish the Order in the United States in the early 1800s by three nuns who were refugees of Revolutionary France, the Poor Clares were not permanently established in the country until the late 1870s.

A small group of Colettine nuns arrived from Düsseldorf, Germany, seeking a refuge for the community which had been expelled from their monastery by the government policies of the Kulturkampf. They found a welcome in the Diocese of Cleveland, and in 1877 established a monastery in that city. At the urging of Mary Ignatius Hayes in 1875 Pope Pius IX had already authorized the sending of nuns to establish a monastery of Poor Clares of the Primitive Observance from San Damiano in Assisi. After the reluctance on the part of many bishops to accept them, due to their reliance upon donations for their maintenance, a community was finally established in Omaha, Nebraska, in 1878.

Currently there are also monasteries in (among other places): Alexandria, Virginia (P.C.C); Andover, Massachusetts; Belleville, Illinois (P.C.C.); Bordentown, New Jersey; Boston, Massachusetts; Brenham, Texas; Chicago, Illinois; Cincinnati, Ohio; Cleveland, Ohio (O.S.C., P.C.C. and P.C.P.A.); Fort Wayne, Indiana; Evansville, Indiana; Kokomo, Indiana; Los Altos Hills, California; Memphis, Tennessee; metropolitan Richmond, Virginia; New Orleans; Philadelphia, Pennsylvania; Phoenix, Arizona; Rockford, Illinois (P.C.C.); Roswell, New Mexico (P.C.C.); Saginaw, Michigan; Spokane, Washington;/ Travelers Rest, South Carolina; Washington D.C.; and Wappingers Falls, New York. Additionally there are monasteries in Alabama (P.C.P.A.), California, Florida, Missouri, Montana and Tennessee. Since the 1980s, the nuns of New York City have formed small satellite communities in Connecticut and New Jersey. There is one monastery of the Capuchin Observance in Denver, Colorado, founded from Mexico in 1988.

Canada
There are three monasteries of the Order in Canada: St. Clare's Monastery at Duncan, British Columbia; and at Mission, British Columbia; and a French-speaking community in Valleyfield, Quebec.

Latin America

There have been monasteries of the Order in Mexico since colonial days. The Capuchin nuns alone number some 1,350 living in 73 different monasteries around the country.

A monastery was founded in Huehuetenango, Guatemala, by nuns from the community in Memphis, Tennessee, in November 1981, in the early days of a bloody civil war which ravaged that country; as of 2011, it consisted of seven nuns; five Guatemalans and two Salvadorans.

Asia

The Poor Clares were massacred at Acre during the reconquest of Palestine after the Crusades. StCharles de Foucauld served both communities between 1897 and 1900. These French Clarissians were expelled from the Ottoman Empire at the onset of World War I; the communities were subsequently reestablished in 1949 amid the creation of Israel.

The Poor Clare in the Philippines was led by Jeronima of the Assumption who was authorized by the King of Spain and the Minister General of the Order of Friars Minor to go there to found a monastery. She was from Toledo, Spain and left Madrid in April 1620 in her 60s and arrived in Manila on 5 August 1621 with other 14 sisters. They are the first contemplative nuns who arrived in the Philippine archipelago to support the active works of evangelization of the Franciscans working in the country through their life of contemplation, penance, poverty, and enclosure.

Together with the Alcantarine Friars who came to the Philippines in 1578 and strive to live the ideals of Francis of Assisi in a very rigorous way, the Poor Clare sisters also professed the Rule and life of Clare of Assisi. They heightened their witnessing of the "privilege of poverty" of Clare by not having a permanent income but rather opened their gates of the Divine Providence through alms and the generosity of the people. 

Their Monastery in Intramuros was severely devastated by an earthquake. However, through the efforts of the people around, it was rebuilt and has a larger space compared to the former monastery. During the war for independence in the year 1945, the monastery was destroyed again and the sisters were forced to evacuate the place. For the meantime, they were sheltered at the Minor Seminary of the Franciscans in San Francisco del Monte, Quezon City for 5 years. The present location of the Monastery is at Aurora Boulevard, C5, Katipunan, Quezon City. Because of the zeal for the contemplative life, the founder's cause is ongoing for beatification.

Apart from the said monastery, it also expand its presence from the different parts of the country. The country is blessed with 27 monasteries: Sariaya Quezon (1957); Calbayog, Samar (1965); Betis and Guagua, Pampanga (1968); Cabuyao, Laguna and Tayud, Cebu (1975): Maria, Siquijor and Isabela, Basilan in (1986); Josefina, Zamboanga del Sur, (1989); Kidapawan, North Cotabato, Balanga Bataan, Lopez (Quezon Province), and Cabid-an, Sorsogon (1990); Guibang, Isabela, Mondragon, Northern Samar and Naval, Biliran (1991); Iguig, Tuguegarao (1992); Bolinao, Pangasinan and Cantilan, Surigao del Sur (1993); Boac, Marinduque and Polomoloc, South Cotabato (1998); Aritao, Nueva Vizcaya (1999); Tabon-tabon, Albay and San Jose, Antique (2004); Borongan, Eastern Samar and Malasiqui Pangasinan (2011) and Tabuk, Kalinga (2017). The Poor Clare Monastery in Palawan province is founded by the Monastery from China.

Furthermore, their expansion does not only limit in the Philippine archipelago but also helped the aging communities in Tahiti, France, Italy, England, Germany, Egypt, USA. They were able to found new monasteries in abroad such as in Malaysia, Papua New Guinea, Taiwan, Hongkong. 

There are also monastery from Kiryū, Gunma, Japan, which was founded from the monastery in Boston in 1965.

Connections with television
 In 1958, Saint Clare was declared the patron saint of television by the Catholic Church.
 The Eternal Word Television Network (EWTN) is operated by the Poor Clares of Perpetual Adoration in Alabama. It is privately owned.
 In June and July 2006, BBC Two broadcast a television series called The Convent, in which four women were admitted to a Poor Clare monastery in southern England, for a period of six weeks, to observe the life.

Notes and references

External links

 Poor Clares Official U.S. website
 The Catholic Encyclopedia: The Poor Clares
 Prayer for Poor Clare and Franciscan Vocations
 The Convent television series
 

 
1212 establishments in Europe
Christian religious orders established in the 13th century